José Luis Arroyo (born 25 June 1987 in Puerto Rico) is a Puerto Rican footballer. He currently plays as a striker for River Plate Puerto Rico of the Puerto Rico Soccer League.

References

External links

1987 births
Living people
Soccer players from San Antonio
Puerto Rican footballers
Puerto Rico international footballers
American soccer players
American people of Puerto Rican descent
Association football forwards